Attila Zsivoczky (born 29 April 1977, in Budapest) is a Hungarian track and field athlete, competing in decathlon. He has previously specialized in high jump, where he took a fourth place at the 1994 World Junior Championships in Athletics.

His father Gyula Zsivótzky was an Olympic champion in hammer throw.

Achievements

Awards
 Hungarian athlete of the Year (3): 2001, 2005, 2006

References
 
 

1977 births
Living people
Athletes from Budapest
Hungarian male high jumpers
Hungarian decathletes
Athletes (track and field) at the 2000 Summer Olympics
Athletes (track and field) at the 2004 Summer Olympics
Athletes (track and field) at the 2008 Summer Olympics
Olympic athletes of Hungary
World Athletics Championships athletes for Hungary
World Athletics Championships medalists
European Athletics Championships medalists